A Killer Among Friends is a 1992 made-for-television movie that aired on CBS on December 8, 1992. Based on a true story, the film stars Patty Duke as a mother grieving for her murdered daughter (Tiffani Thiessen) and sets out to find the killer. The film is based on the real life murder of Michele Avila.

Plot
Jennifer “Jenny” Monroe (Tiffani Thiessen) is a beautiful and popular teenage girl who lives with her brothers and loving mother, Jean (Patty Duke). Jenny’s relationship with her childhood best friend, Ellen Holloway (Margaret Welsh), becomes strained due to Ellen’s insecurities and increasing jealousy of Jenny’s beauty, popularity with boys, and idyllic home life. Tensions grow worse after Ellen pressures Jenny into shoplifting and erroneously accuses her of sleeping with her boyfriend. One day, Jenny leaves to hang out with her friend, Carla Lewis. When Jenny does not return home, Jean becomes worried and alerts the police. Days later, Jenny is found in a creek, having been drowned, with a 100-pound log placed over her body. Jean is grief-stricken, and Ellen becomes her emotional support, eventually moving into her home. Jean becomes frustrated by the failure of the detectives to find Jenny’s killer. She and Ellen begin tracking their own leads, much at Ellen’s behest. Ellen’s behavior becomes increasingly erratic, and her obsession with the case intensifies, causing tension among Jean and her family, who feels Ellen is an unhealthy influence on her. Jean eventually asks Ellen to move out so that she can move on with her life. Some time later, a guilt-ridden acquaintance of Jenny’s, Kathy Pearl (Janne Mortil), goes to the police and confesses to witnessing Jenny’s murder. She tells them Carla lured Jenny out of her house and drove her to a secluded a wooded area in a National park, where Carla and Ellen confronted her with allegedly stealing their boyfriends. They taunted her, cut her hair, and forced her into a stream, eventually drowning her. After hearing the news, Jean is devastated but confronts Ellen at the police station, where she and Carla are arrested. After finally receiving closure, Jean attempts to move on with her family and find peace.

Cast
 Patty Duke as Jean Monroe
 Margaret Welsh as Ellen Holloway
 Tiffani Thiessen as Jennifer Anne "Jenny" Monroe
 Angie Rae McKinney as Carla Lewis
 David Cubitt as Greg Monroe
 Janne Mortil as Kathy Pearl
 Loretta Swit as Detective Patricia Staley
 Debra Sharkey as Sheryl Monroe
 Chad Todhunter as Adam Monroe
 Ben Bass as Steve
 William S. Taylor as Detective Mike Collins
 Babs Chula as Diane
 Matthew Bennett as Dan
 Heather and Sharon Beaty as Celeste
 Barry Pepper as Mickey Turner
 Lisa Vultaggio as Susan

External links

CBS network films
Crime films based on actual events
1992 television films
1992 films
Films directed by Charles Robert Carner